Wenquan is a common name for places in the People's Republic of China:

County
Wenquan County (温泉县), of the Bortala Mongol Autonomous Prefecture, Xinjiang

Towns (温泉镇)
 Wenquan, Anhui, in Yuexi County
 Wenquan, Beijing, in Haidian District
 Wenquan, Chongqing, in Kai County
 Wenquan, Guangdong, in Conghua
 Wenquan, Luchuan County, Guangxi
 Wenquan, Guiyang, in Xifeng County, Guizhou
 Wenquan, Suiyang County, Guizhou
 Wenquan, Ruzhou, Henan
 Wenquan, Jiaozuo, Wen County, Henan
 Wenquan, Huanggang, Yingshan County, Hubei
 Wenquan, Donghai County, Jiangsu
 Wenquan, Fuzhou, Jiangxi, in Linchuan District
 Wenquan, Tonggu County, Jiangxi
 Wenquan, Xingzi County, Jiangxi
 Wenquan, Mian County, Shaanxi
 Wenquan, Jimo, Shandong
 Wenquan, Weihai, in Huancui District, Weihai, Shandong

Townships (温泉乡)
 Wenquan Township, Qingyang, in Xifeng District, Qingyang, Gansu
 Wenquan Township, Tianshui, in Wushan County, Gansu
 Wenquan Township, Qinghai, in Xinghai County
 Wenquan Township, Jiaokou County, Shanxi
 Wenquan Township, Kelan County, Shanxi
 Wenquan Township, Yunnan, in Changning County

Subdistricts (温泉街道)
 Wenquan Subdistrict, Fuzhou, in Gulou District, Fuzhou, Fujian
 Wenquan Subdistrict, Xianning, in Xian'an District, Xianning, Hubei
 Wenquan Subdistrict, Arxan, Inner Mongolia
 Wenquan Subdistrict, Xingcheng, Liaoning
 Wenquan Subdistrict, Zhaoyuan, Shandong
 Wenquan Subdistrict, Anning, Yunnan

Smaller localities
Wenquan, Golmud, a locality in Golmud County, Qinghai, near the border with Tibet

Other uses
 Li Wenquan (李文全), archer